Quintarelli is an Italian surname. Notable people with the surname include:

 Cristina Quintarelli (born 1963), Italian swimmer
 Ronnie Quintarelli (born 1979), Italian racecar driver
 Stefano Quintarelli (born 1965), Italian IT expert

Italian-language surnames